The 2000–01 season was Cardiff City F.C.'s 74th season in the Football League. They competed in the 24-team Division Three, then the fourth tier of English football, finishing second, winning promotion to Division Two.

During the season the club was taken over by Lebanese businessman Sam Hammam, whose investment in the club would later see Cardiff win two promotions in the next four years.

Players

First team squad.

Left club during season

League table

Results by round

Fixtures and results

Third Division

Source

Worthington Cup (League Cup)

FA Cup

LDV Vans Trophy

FAW Premier Cup

See also
List of Cardiff City F.C. seasons

References

Bibliography

Welsh Football Data Archive

2000-01
Welsh football clubs 2000–01 season
2000–01 Football League Third Division by team